Andrew George Stenhouse  (1869-1950) was a Scottish businessman, geologist and astronomer.

Life
Stenhouse was born in Edinburgh, the eldest son of Andrew Stenhouse, a shipbroker and joint owner of A & G Stenhouse in Leith. His father lived at 125 High Street on the Royal Mile. He was educated at the Royal High School, Edinburgh and then joined his father's company in Leith Docks.

In 1904, Stenhouse was elected a Fellow of the Geological Society of London. In 1923, he was elected a Fellow of the Royal Society of Edinburgh. His proposers were John Horne, Ben Peach, Thomas James Jehu and Robert Campbell.

The Stenhousebreen glacier in Svalbard is named for Stenhouse, who had assisted the surveyor John Mathieson in preparing a map of Svalbard.

Stenhouse died on 12 October 1950 in Edinburgh, aged 81.

References

1950 deaths
1869 births
Scientists from Edinburgh
Scottish businesspeople
Scottish astronomers
Scottish geologists
Fellows of the Royal Society of Edinburgh
Fellows of the Royal Geographical Society